Piazza del Duomo ("Cathedral Square") may refer to several squares in Italy:

Piazza del Duomo, Florence
Piazza del Duomo, Milan
Piazza del Duomo, Pisa
Piazza del Duomo, Siena
Piazza Duomo, Padua
Piazza del Duomo, Catania
Piazza del Duomo, San Gimignano
Piazza del Duomo, Reggio Emilia
Piazza del Duomo, L'Aquila
Piazza del Duomo (Altamura)